Wilmer Ebert Shantz (July 31, 1927 – December 13, 1993) was an American professional baseball catcher and manager. He appeared in 131 Major League Baseball (MLB) games, 130 of them for the 1954–55 Philadelphia/Kansas City Athletics and one for the 1960 New York Yankees. He batted and threw right-handed.

Born in Pottstown, Pennsylvania, Shantz began his pro career in 1948 in the Athletics' farm system and played continuously through 1962, including his two full seasons in MLB. He was the second-string catcher and a teammate of his elder brother's during the Athletics' last season in Philadelphia and their first year in Kansas City, hitting .256 and .258 and collecting two home runs among his 98 total hits. In 1959, he followed Bobby to the Yankees' organization, where he played at the Triple-A level and appeared in one big-league game, on June 29, 1960, against the Athletics, as a defensive replacement. In relief of Yogi Berra, he caught the final inning of Jim Coates' 10–0 shutout victory and did not have a plate appearance.

Shantz served as a player-manager in Panama.

Billy Shantz played 1,181 minor league games over 16 total seasons, including a stint as a playing coach in 1966.  He also managed in the Yankee farm system for four seasons (1963; 1967–69). He died at age 66 in Lauderhill, Florida.

References

External links

1927 births
1993 deaths
Baseball players from Pennsylvania
Charleston Senators players
Columbus Jets players
Fort Lauderdale Yankees managers
Kansas City Athletics players
Kewanee Boilermakers players
Lincoln A's players
Major League Baseball catchers
Martinsville A's players
New York Yankees players
People from Pottstown, Pennsylvania
Philadelphia Athletics players
Richmond Virginians (minor league) players
Rochester Red Wings players
Toledo Mud Hens players
Kewanee A's players
American expatriate baseball players in Panama